Jonathan Lee Hogg (born 6 December 1988) is an English professional footballer who plays for Championship club Huddersfield Town as a central midfielder. He has previously played for Watford and Aston Villa, and spent periods on loan at Darlington and Portsmouth.

Career

Aston Villa
Hogg was born in Middlesbrough, North Yorkshire. A midfielder, he began his football career as a junior with hometown club Middlesbrough, before joining Aston Villa. His progress was interrupted by a cruciate ligament injury in March 2007, but he came back to become Villa's reserve team's leading goalscorer as they won the 2008–09 Premier Reserve League Southern section. Handed a two-year contract in July 2008, he was part of Villa's squad that won the 2009 Peace Cup, a pre-season tournament.

On 19 August 2010, Hogg made his first competitive start for Aston Villa in a 1–1 draw away to Rapid Vienna in the Europa League Play-off round. Owing to injuries to several other midfield players, he made his Premier League debut in the home match against Manchester United on 13 November 2010. In December 2010, Hogg signed a new contract to tie him to the club until 2013.

Darlington (loan)
In November 2009, Hogg joined League Two's last-placed side Darlington on loan for six weeks. He made his debut in the Football League on 21 November away at Chesterfield; he played the whole game, and scored in the 87th minute to set up a close finish, but Chesterfield's Scott Boden scored twice very late in the game to make the final score 5–2.

Portsmouth (loan)
On 25 January 2011, Hogg joined Championship club Portsmouth on loan until the end of the season. He made his debut the same day in a 2–1 home league defeat to Burnley.

Watford
Hogg joined Football League Championship club Watford for an undisclosed fee on 27 August 2011, signing a three-year contract, joining his former Villa youth teammate, Troy Deeney, at Vicarage Road in the process. He made his debut for Watford two days later against Aston Villa's arch-rivals, Birmingham City. Hogg finished the season having started 40 games in the league and came fourth in the Watford F.C. Player of the Season award.

Hogg had the assist for one of English football's most famous goals, when his knockdown of a Fernando Forestieri cross in the 96th minute of the second leg of the 2013 Championship Play-Off Semifinal drew out Leicester City goalkeeper Kasper Schmeichel. The ball fell in the path of Deeney, who scored the winning goal, sending Watford on to the final.  The opportunity immediately followed a double-save by Watford goalkeeper Manuel Almunia on a penalty and follow-up by Leicester midfielder Anthony Knockaert, which, if converted, would have sent Leicester on instead of Watford. Hogg and Deeney celebrated the winner by leaping into the Graham Taylor stand at Vicarage Road, part of the ensuing celebratory pitch invasion at Watford's home ground.

Huddersfield Town
Despite being a first-team regular at Watford, Hogg joined Huddersfield Town on a three-year contract on 29 July 2013, motivated by family reasons to request the transfer. He made his debut for the Terriers in their 1–0 defeat to Nottingham Forest on 3 August. He scored his first goal for the club in the 3–2 win over Charlton Athletic in the Football League Cup on 27 August 2013. His first league goal for the Terriers came in their 2–1 win over Barnsley on 20 August 2016, his first league goal in 7 years.

In the 2016–17 season, Huddersfield Town gained promotion to the Premier League for the first time. Hogg was voted "Player's Player of the Year" by his teammates. During that season, Hogg suffered a collision with a teammate and was taken to hospital after a defeat away at Bristol City on 17 March 2017. He was initially ruled out for the remainder of the season after fears that he had fractured his neck. However, after further scans, he was allowed to return less than a month later on 5 April for a victory against Norwich City.

On 9 August 2017, manager David Wagner appointed Tommy Smith as the club captain with Hogg and German defender Christopher Schindler as his deputies.

During his eight seasons at Huddersfield to date, the tough-tackling central midfielder has become a crowd favourite, making over 250 appearances for the club.

2020/21

On 13 March 2021 the former Huddersfield manager, Danny Cowley, referred to Hogg as "...a fantastic professional. He brings so much to the team, not only in terms of his ability as a player but also the substance he brings. When he plays he gives them the grit and the determination that Huddersfield  need”.

Hogg scored just his second goal for Huddersfield on 7 April 2021, a header from a corner, which proved to be a consolation in a home 2–1 defeat to AFC Bournemouth. On 7 May 2021, he was named by supporters as the club's Blue & White Foundation Player of the Year, ahead of teammate Lewis O'Brien. Two weeks later, Hogg also received the Hargreaves Memorial Player of the Year Trophy, receiving 35% of supporters' votes.

2021/22
On 29 June 2021 Hogg was appointed club captain.  Head Coach Carlos Corberán was quoted as saying “Being a Captain is not only when you have the armband on a game day. You must lead by example. You must be a professional footballer 24/7 and bring everyone else up to your standards, so they have the same mentality. We know that Hoggy will do that.”.

On 14 September 2021 Hogg scored his third league goal for Huddersfield in a 3–0 away win at Blackpool.  He chested the ball down and struck a half volley from just outside the area into the top corner of the goal.

On 30 October 2021 Hogg scored his second goal of the season with a late header at home to Millwall from a Sorba Thomas corner, which proved to be the only goal of the game.

Career statistics

Honours
Huddersfield Town
EFL Championship play-offs: 2017
 2017 Players’ Player of the Year
 2021 Blue & White Foundation Player of the Year
 2021 Hargreaves Memorial Trophy Winner (Player of the Year)

References

External links 
 
 Jonathan Hogg profile at the Aston Villa website

1988 births
Living people
Footballers from Middlesbrough
English footballers
Association football midfielders
Aston Villa F.C. players
Darlington F.C. players
Portsmouth F.C. players
Watford F.C. players
Huddersfield Town A.F.C. players
Premier League players
English Football League players